Ginaw Bilog was a Filipino poet who was recognized as a National Living Treasure by the Philippine government.

Born on January 3, 1953, Bilog was a Hanunuo Mangyan who was a native of Mansalay, Oriental Mindoro. He was known for his efforts in preserving the Mangyan poetry tradition of ambahan.

Then-President Fidel V. Ramos, conferred the National Living Treasure Award to Ginaw Bilog on December 17, 1993, in recognition of his people's preservation efforts of the ambahan poetry, which is recorded on bamboo.

He died on June 3, 2003, at age 50 due to a lingering illness.

References

Filipino poets
People from Oriental Mindoro
1953 births
2003 deaths
National Living Treasures of the Philippines